Herbie Hancock Trio (with bassist Ron Carter & drummer Tony Williams) is the thirty-first album and the second of the same name by Herbie Hancock.  (The first one was released in 1977; this one was released in 1982).

Track listing
"Stable Mates" (Benny Golson) – 11:05
"Dolphin Dance" (Hancock) – 10:18
"A Slight Smile" (Carter) – 9:03
"That Old Black Magic" (Harold Arlen, Johnny Mercer) – 8:33
"La Maison Goree" – (Williams) - 6:41

Personnel
Herbie Hancock – piano
Ron Carter – bass
Tony Williams – drums

References

Herbie Hancock albums
Columbia Records albums
1982 albums
Albums produced by Dave Rubinson